, there were about 3,000 electric vehicles in Arkansas.

Government policy
, the state government charges a $200 annual registration fee for electric vehicles.

Charging stations
, there were about 160 public charging stations in Arkansas.

The Infrastructure Investment and Jobs Act, signed into law in November 2021, allocates  to charging stations in Arkansas.

Manufacturing
Arkansas has been proposed as a potential hub for electric vehicle manufacturing.

References

Arkansas
Road transportation in Arkansas